While the World Chess Championship title, contested officially since 1886 and unofficially long before that, is in theory open to all players, it was for many years contested solely by men. In 1927, FIDE therefore established a Women's World Chess Championship exclusively for female players. Like the "open" title, the format for the women's championship has undergone several changes since then, the most important of which are described here.

The Championship before World War II (1927–39) 

The International Chess Federation (FIDE) was founded in 1924 and quickly came up with the idea of taking control of the World Championship, although this did not happen until 1948. The Women's World Championship, however, was a new creation by FIDE and thus held under their auspices from the beginning.

All official Women's Championships except one before World War II were held as round-robin tournaments concurrently with one of the Chess Olympiads, also controlled by FIDE – and all of them were won by the same player: Vera Menchik, by far the dominating figure in this early era of organized women's chess. Menchik, who usually preferred to compete in regular open tournaments against men (and beat several of them), first won the title at the first official Olympiad in London in 1927 and since defended it successfully no less than eight times, six times at subsequent Olympiads (in 1930, 31, 33, 35, 37, and 39, respectively) and twice in matches against Sonja Graf, arguably the second-strongest female player of that era. These matches were arranged largely by the players themselves, much like the open title at the time. The first match (in 1934) was unofficial, while the second one (in 1937) was recognized by FIDE as official.

Introduction of the Championship cycle (1949–99) 

Both reigning champions died during or shortly after World War II, Menchik during a bombing raid on her home in England in 1944 and Alexander Alekhine under somewhat suspicious circumstances in early 1946. FIDE promptly seized the opportunity to take control of the open title and produce standardized rules for both titles. This meant a cycle of Zonal, Interzonal, and Candidates Tournaments to produce a challenger who would then face the defending champion in a match for the title.

Naturally, since women only made up a small part of the total number of players, this system was only introduced gradually for the women's title. The first Candidates Tournament was held in 1952 and the first Interzonal in 1971. In the same cycle (1971–72), the format for the Candidates Tournament was changed from a round-robin to a knock-out series of matches. In 1976, the number of Interzonals was increased to two, due to the growing number of zones and chess-playing nations worldwide.

In 1986, the Candidates Tournament went back to the round-robin format and from 1991 there was again only played one Interzonal, but with a higher number of participants and using the Swiss system. The last championship cycle using this format (from 1995 to 1999) was surrounded by much controversy and followed by some major changes to the system.

Knock-out Championships

Beginning in 2001, the women's championship, like the open one, was contested as single-elimination tournaments with 64 players playing mini-matches for six rounds until only one remained. In the case of the open title this format was widely criticized, since several of the tournaments played during this period (1998–2004) were won by players with relatively low ratings. This was taken by some as a devaluation of the title. In the case of the women's championship, however, all of the knock-out tournaments were actually won by players who have before or since proven that they do belong to the absolute world elite.

Alternating formats

Since 2010, the women's championship has been held every year but in two alternating formats. In even years, the championship is still decided in a 64-player knock-out tournament. In odd years, however, the reigning champion from the year before will then defend her title in a match against a challenger. The challenger is determined through a Grand Prix series of six tournaments. There are various ways to qualify for the Grand Prix, but the field consists of 18 players, most of which are among the very strongest in the world.

Results

The tables below show the qualifiers and results for all Interzonal, Candidates and World Championship tournaments and matches. Players shown bracketed in italics (e.g. (Kushnir) in 1973–75) qualified for or were seeded in a specific stage of the championship cycle, but did not play. Players listed after players in italics (like Stefanova in 2011) only qualified due to the non-participation of the bracketed players.

The "Seeded into Final" column usually refers to the incumbent champion, but this has a different meaning for the 1949–50 tournament which was held to produce a new champion after the death of Menchik, and for the knock-out tournaments since 2001, where the defending champion gets no special privileges.

1949–1999: Interzonals and Candidates Tournaments

2000–2010: Knock-out tournaments

2011–present: alternating formats

Notes

References
 World Chess Championship for Women, Mark Weeks' chess pages
 Women's World Championship events 1949/50-present, Mark Weeks' chess pages
 "Chess and Women" by Edward Winter

Women's World Chess Championships
History of chess